Draba reptans, common names Carolina draba, Carolina whitlow-grass, Creeping whitlow-grass, and  Whitlow-grass, is an annual plant in the family Brassicaceae that is native to North America.

Conservation status in the United States
It is listed as a special concern in Connecticut, as threatened in Michigan, New York, and Ohio, as endangered in New Jersey, as extirpated  in Pennsylvania, and as historical in Rhode Island.

Native American ethnobotany

The Ramah Navajo apply a poultice of the crushed leaves of the plant to sores.

References

reptans
Flora of North America
Plants used in traditional Native American medicine